, known professionally as , is a Japanese actor. He is well known for his starring roles in Shall We Dance? (1996), Cure (1997), Memoirs of a Geisha (2005), 13 Assassins (2010), The Third Murder (2017), The Blood of Wolves (2018) and Under the Open Sky (2020). He is also best known internationally for his role as Takuro Yamashita in Shōhei Imamura's The Eel, which won the Palme d'Or at the 1997 Cannes Film Festival and as Yasujiro Wataya in Alejandro González Iñárritu's Babel (2006) which was nominated for Best Picture at the 79th Academy Awards. Yakusho has won three Japan Academy Prize for his performances in Shall We Dance?, The Third Murder and The Blood of Wolves.

Career
Yakusho was born in Isahaya, Nagasaki, the youngest of five brothers. After graduation from Nagasaki Prefectural High School of Technology in 1974, he worked at the Chiyoda municipal ward office, or kuyakusho, in Tokyo, from which he later took his stage name. In 1976, he saw a production of Maxim Gorky's The Lower Depths and was inspired, first to watch, and then later to take part in, as many plays as possible.

In the spring of 1978 he auditioned for Tatsuya Nakadai's the Mumeijuku (Studio for Unknown Performers) acting studio, and was one of four chosen out of 800 applicants. While at the school he met actress Saeko Kawatsu, whom he married in 1982. Their son was born in 1985.

In 1983, he landed the role of Oda Nobunaga in the year-long NHK drama Tokugawa Ieyasu and was catapulted to fame. He also appeared in a TV version of Miyamoto Musashi from 1984 to 1985. For several years, he played Kuji Shinnosuke (or "Sengoku"), one of the title characters in the jidaigeki Sambiki ga Kiru!. He played a major character in Juzo Itami's 1986 Tampopo.

In 1988, he was given a special award for work in cinema by the Japanese Minister of Education, Science, Sports and Culture and continued to appear in films and in a number of TV shows through the '90s.

In 1996 and 1997, Yakusho enjoyed several major successes. The Eel, directed by Shohei Imamura, in which he played the eel-loving lead, won the Palme d'Or at the 1997 Cannes Film Festival. Lawrence Van Gelder in the New York Times called his performance "unerring." A Lost Paradise, about a double-suicide, was second only to Princess Mononoke at the Japanese box office.

International breakthrough: Shall We Dance?

Shall We Dance? was such a major hit in Japan that it inspired a domestic dance craze. Ballroom groups and dance schools multiplied in the country after the film's release, and people who previously would never admit to taking lessons announced that they did with pride. Director Masayuki Suo said of his lead, who until that point was known mostly for playing good-looking samurai, "we thought he could play this overworked, tired Japanese businessman, and he did.... [H]e pulled everything off and took his dance training so seriously."

The film also was one of Japan's highest-grossing movies outside the country. It earned $9.5 million in the US and inspired a remake starring Jennifer Lopez and Richard Gere, with Gere playing Yakusho's role.

Yakusho next won the Hochi Film Award for Best Actor for Bounce Ko Gals, a film which dealt with high school prostitution specifically, and money worship in general. He collaborated with horror director Kiyoshi Kurosawa in Cure, License to Live, Seance, Charisma, Pulse, Doppelganger, Retribution, and Tokyo Sonata. Yakusho found further recognition with international audiences to some extent with roles in such films as Memoirs of a Geisha and Babel. In the latter, directed by Alejandro González Iñárritu, he played the father of the deaf-mute played by Rinko Kikuchi.

Later work

In 2009, he debuted as director and writer of Toad's Oil. In 2010 and 2011 he was part of both ensemble casts in Takashi Miike's samurai films, 13 Assassins and Hara-Kiri: Death of a Samurai. The latter was in 3D and the first 3D film to be in competition at the Cannes Film Festival.

In the 2011 war drama film Rengō Kantai Shirei Chōkan: Yamamoto Isoroku, Yakusho portrayed Admiral Isoroku Yamamoto. Yakusho was reportedly the only actor considered for the role; had he not accepted it, the film would have been canceled.

In 2018 he was in The Blood of Wolves.

Filmography

Film

Television

Dubbing roles
Live-action
Band of Brothers – Richard Winters (Damian Lewis)
Animation
Astro Boy – Dr. Tenma
Over the Hedge – RJ

Awards and nominations 

Honors

References

External links

 
 
 Profile on All Movie Guide
 Profile at Japan Zone
 The Film of '97 at Japan File

1956 births
Japanese male actors
Living people
Actors from Nagasaki Prefecture
Recipients of the Medal with Purple Ribbon
Best Actor Asian Film Award winners